{{Infobox writer
| name             = Dorothy Leigh
| embed            = 
| honorific_prefix = 
| honorific_suffix = 
| image            = 
| image_size       = 
| image_upright    = 
| alt              = 
| caption          = 
| birth_name       = Dorothy Kemp (or Kempe)
| birth_date       = Unknown
| birth_place      = England
| death_date       = 
| death_place      = England
| occupation       = Writer
| notableworks     = The Mother's Blessing
| spouse           = Ralph Leigh
}}

Dorothy Leigh ( Kemp or Kempe; died ) was a 17th-century British writer remembered for The Mother's Blessing (1616).

Biography
Dorothy Kemp (or Kempe) was the daughter of William Kemp (or Robert Kemp), of Finchingfield, Essex. She married Ralph Leigh of Cheshire (or Ralph Lee of Sussex), a soldier under the Earl of Essex at Cádiz.The Mother's Blessing was dedicated to the Princess Elizabeth, wife to the Count Palatine. It includes a prefixed a poem entitled "Counsell to my Children, George, John, and William Leigh". In 1626, her son William was appointed Rector of Groton, in Suffolk.

Dorothy Leigh died in or before 1616.

Selected works
1616, The mothers blessing, or, The godly counsaile of a gentle-woman not long since deceased, left behind her for her children : containing many good exhortations, and godly admonitions, profitable for all parents to leave as a legacy to their children, but especially for those, who by reason of their young yeeres stand most in need of instruction''

References

External links
Dorothy Leigh at Oxford Dictionary of National Biography

1616 deaths
17th-century English writers
English women writers
Year of birth unknown